Dryocosmus jungalii is a gall wasp species in the family Cynipidae whose life cycle involves only Palaearctic oaks, Quercus subgen. Quercus, in the section Cerris.

References

Further reading
Ide, Tatsuya, and Yoshihisa Abe. "A New Species of Dryocosmus Giraud (Hymenoptera: Cynipidae: Cynipini) in Japan and Korea-First Record of Eastern Palearctic Dryocosmus Species Showing Alternation of Generations on Section Cerris Oaks." Proceedings of the Entomological Society of Washington 117.4 (2015): 467–180.

Cynipidae
Gall-inducing insects
Insects described in 2010